We Sing. is the first EP of a three EP collection that was available for a limited time from the singer/songwriter Jason Mraz to help promote his third studio album, We Sing. We Dance. We Steal Things.. Physical copies of this EP are rare. It was mainly released for those who pre-ordered We Sing, We Dance, We Steal Things from JasonMraz.com. The EP was released on March 18, 2008. The EP is also included on the limited edition version of We Sing. We Dance. We Steal Things. which was released on November 18, 2008. It peaked at number 101 on Billboard 200 on April 5, 2008.

Track listing

Charts

References

2008 EPs
Jason Mraz EPs